The Ohiopyle Low Bridge is a structure that carries the Great Allegheny Passage trail across the Youghiogheny River in Ohiopyle, Pennsylvania.

The span was originally opened in 1912 as part of the last major railroad constructed in Pennsylvania. It served the Western Maryland Railway's expansion from Cumberland, Maryland to Connellsville, Pennsylvania and was one of two bridges to cross a meandering section of the Yough in Ohiopyle.  The original deck girder bridge was located near the center of the tiny community of Ohiopyle and opened the rugged region to tourism.

By the 1960s, the importance of the Low Bridge had been dramatically reduced. The automobile had replaced the train as the method of transportation to what was now Ohiopyle State Park, and the narrow clearance of Pennsylvania Route 381's passage under the bridge would lead to bottlenecks during the summer tourism season.  The Western Maryland Railway was incorporated into the Chessie System holding company and saw traffic greatly reduced on ancillary lines; in 1975, all service west of Hancock, Maryland was eliminated.  

Following the closure of the line, a portion of the old bridge was removed to allow for better truck access along PA 381, while the remainder of the structure sat vacant until its incorporation into the Great Allegheny Passage. In 1999, a new bowstring truss bridge was opened on the existing piers of its predecessor. The new bridge is the longest of its type in Pennsylvania.

References

External links

Bridge Mapper
Uncommon Passage

Bridges in Fayette County, Pennsylvania
Bridges completed in 1912
Bridges completed in 1999
1912 establishments in Pennsylvania
Bridges over the Youghiogheny River
Bowstring truss bridges in the United States
Pedestrian bridges in Pennsylvania